Bilstein is a mountain of Hesse in the Vogelsberg, Germany.

Mountains of Hesse
Mountains and hills of the Vogelsberg